The Journal of Financial Stability is a bimonthly peer-reviewed academic journal on financial crises and stability. It is published by Elsevier and the editor-in-chief is Iftekhar Hasan (Fordham University). It was established in 2004.

Abstracting and indexing
The journal is abstracted and indexed in:
Social Sciences Citation Index
Scopus
EconLit
 RePEc
According to the Journal Citation Reports, the journal has a 2020 impact factor of  3.727.

References

External links

Finance journals
English-language journals
Bimonthly journals
Publications established in 2004
Elsevier academic journals